Caught in the Act is a 1931 German comedy film directed by Hanns Schwarz and Georges Tréville and starring Blanche Montel, Henri Garat, and Ralph Arthur Roberts. It was produced by UFA, as the French-language version of the studio's film Burglars. Such multiple-language versions were common in the early years of sound before dubbing became widespread.

The film's sets were designed by the art director Erich Kettelhut. It was shot at the Babelsberg Studios.

Cast

References

Bibliography

External links 
 

1931 films
German comedy films
1931 comedy films
1930s French-language films
Films directed by Georges Tréville
Films directed by Hanns Schwarz
Films scored by Franz Waxman
Films scored by Friedrich Hollaender
UFA GmbH films
German multilingual films
Films shot at Babelsberg Studios
German black-and-white films
1931 multilingual films
Films based on works by Louis Verneuil
1930s German films